The 2003 Southeast Asian Games, officially known as the 22nd Southeast Asian Games, SEA Games 22 and also known as Vietnam 2003, was a Southeast Asian multi-sport event held from 5 to 13 December 2003 in Hanoi, Vietnam. This was the first time that Vietnam had staged the SEA Games, and it saw East Timor, which had just gained independence in 2002; although not being an ASEAN member and despite its geographical location closer to the Pacific archipelago than the Asian continent, making its debut at the games.

The games was held from 5 to 13 December 2003, although several events had commenced from 29 November 2003. Around 5,000 athletes from 11 participating nations participated at the games, which featured 442 events in 32 sports. Vietnam is the eighth nation to host the Southeast Asian Games after Thailand, Myanmar, Malaysia, Singapore, Indonesia, Philippines and Brunei. The games was opened by Phan Văn Khải, the Prime Minister of Vietnam at the newly constructed Mỹ Đình National Stadium and was closed by Pham Gia Khiem, the Deputy Prime Minister of Vietnam.

The final medal tally was led by host Vietnam, followed by Thailand and Indonesia. A number of records in Games and National level were broken during this edition. The games were deemed generally successful with the rising standard of competition amongst the participating nations.

Organisation

Development and preparation
The 22nd SEA Games organising committee was formed to oversee the staging of the games with Nguyen Danh Thai as its chairman. The Vietnamese government was spending a lot of money upgrading sports facilities and building new ones, including the 40,000-seat My Dinh National Stadium which is the biggest stadium in the country, spending about 60 million to US$70 million for its construction.

Venues
The 2003 Southeast Asian Games used a mix of new, existing and temporary venues with the centrepiece of the activities being the My Dinh Sports Complex which was opened in September 2003. Incorporating the new 40,192-seat national stadium, it hosted most of the events.

A games village was not built. Instead, a "village in the city" concept saw athletes and officials housed in hotels in Hanoi and Ho Chi Minh City. Besides being physically near to the sport venues, it was hoped that they will add vibe to both cities and reduce post-games costs in converting a dedicated games village to other uses.

The 22nd Southeast Asian Games had 31 venues for the games, 20 in Hanoi (and surrounding provinces) and 11 in Ho Chi Minh City.

Torch relay
The torch relay of the 2003 Southeast Asian Games began with Ho Chi Minh City and passed through several cities in Vietnam before it ended in Hanoi, which is the main venue of the games.

Marketing

Logo

The logo of the 2003 Southeast Asian Games is a stylisation of a legendary bird named "Chim Lac". Designed by Artist Nguyen Chi Long, it depicts the bird decorated the Ngoc Lu bronze drum, a typical antiquity of the ancient Dong Son Vietnamese culture. The Emblem is composed of harmonious and strong curves that resembles movement and strength upwards represents the Olympic Spirit: "Faster, Higher and Stronger". The 5 lines of colours represents the tough and drastic competition in sports. The 10 intersecting circles, the symbol of the Southeast Asian Games Federation, represents the participating nations of the Southeast Asian Games and the Southeast Asian Games itself.

Mascot
Designed by artist Nguyen Thai Hung, the mascot of the 2003 Southeast Asian Games is a golden water buffalo named Trâu Vàng. Described as a gentle, industrious, wise, faithful and harmonious animal in nature, the buffalo resembles the water and rice civilisation in Vietnam, as well as in other Southeast Asian countries. To the Vietnamese people, the Golden Buffalo symbolises a desire for abundant harvest, prosperity, happiness, power and the Vietnamese martial spirit as well as open–heartedness, joy and hospitality of the host country.

Songs
The games' hymn was "For the World of Tomorrow", which was composed by Nguyen Quang Vinh. This song has 2 Versions.

Sponsors
A total of 24 sponsors comprising 2 Official Partners and 22 Official Sponsors sponsored the games.

Official Partners
 LG Electronics
 Vietnam Posts and Telecommunications Group
Official Sponsors 
 Petronas
 Interfood
 Vietnam Bank for Agriculture and Rural Development
 Nestle Milo
 Rinnai
 Halida
 Vietnam MobiFone
 Petrolimex
 Ha Long Canfoco
 Vietnam Airlines
 Vietnam Glass and Ceramics
 Uni-President
 Dai Bang paint
 Dong Luc Sport
 TNT N.V.
 Super Horse Energy Drink
 Petrovietnam
 Bao Viet Vietnam Insurance 
 Vital
 Yamaha
 Foci
 Grand Sport

The games

Opening ceremony

The opening ceremony took place at the Hanoi My Dinh National Stadium at 19:00 VST. A total of 40,000 audience attended the opening ceremony. Also present at the ceremony were General Secretary Nong Duc Manh, Prime Minister Phan Van Khai, officials from ministries, national agencies, the diplomatic corps, the leaders of the Southeast Asian Sports Federation and heads of regional sporting delegations. A parallel ceremony was held in Ho Chi Minh City.

The ceremony started with the song, "Vietnam – Our Fatherland" followed by the appearance of parachutists, carrying 11 national flags of the competing Southeast Asian countries with them. The procession of Vietnam flag and the 22nd SEA Games' symbol flag then took place as all the lights in the stadium came on at once. After that, eleven regional sporting delegations, including 5,005 coaches and athletes, marched past the reviewing stand in an exciting welcome from the officials and spectators.

The sacred torch, which was taken from the Ho Chi Minh Museum was passed by Truong Quoc Thang (cyclist), Bui Thi Nhung (runner), Vu Kim Anh (Karate exponent) and athletes from 10 regional countries to Nguyen Thuy Hien (Wushu exponent). Nguyen Thuy Hien then passed the flame to the Prime Minister who in turn passed it to an athlete dressed like national hero Giong. The athlete who dressed like Giong then lit the flame on the cauldron which burn throughout the course of the Games. Minister-Chairman of the Physical Training and Sports Committee Nguyen Danh Thai, who is also the chairman of the Vietnam National Olympic Committee, president of the 22nd Southeast Asia Sports Council and head of the 22nd SEA Games Organising Board then gave his speech, warmly welcomed Party and State leaders, delegates, domestic and international guests, and 11 sports delegations from Southeast Asian countries to the 22nd SEA Games. After that, on behalf of the host country, Prime Minister Phan Van Khai declared the 22nd SEA Games open. Later, Deputy Prime Minister Pham Gia Khiem, Chairman of the National Steering Board for the 22nd SEA Games, Minister-Chairman Nguyen Danh Thai, and Ha Noi Mayor Hoang Van Nghien presented flowers and banners to 11 participating sports delegations. After that, on behalf of the referees and athletes, referee Hoang Quoc Vinh and shooter Nguyen Manh Tuong swore an oath of "Solidarity, Honesty and Fair Play".

These are followed by a three part mass performance, which is more than a thousand performers including children. The parts that make up the mass performance are "The Land of the Dragon and Fairy" which depicted the Vietnamese legend of the country's origins, "Message of Peace" and "United ASEAN Looks To The Future" which comprises four performances: "Lands by the Pacific Ocean," "Essential Convergence," "New Tune," and "ASEAN Towards The Future". After the mass performance, the Games mascot, the golden buffalo and 22 singers were then appear at the center of the stage with the singers singing the Games official song "For the World of Tomorrow". The ceremony concluded with thousands of flying balls released and fireworks displayed in four places in Hanoi.

Closing ceremony

The closing ceremony was held on 13 December 2003 at the My Dinh National Stadium in Hanoi at 19:00 (VST). Around 40,000 spectators attended the closing ceremony at My Dinh National Stadium including Party General Secretary Nong Duc Manh, Vice President Truong My Hoa and leaders of the Asian Sport Federation.

The ceremony begins with laser beams shooting about in the stadium and colourful parachute gliders pierced through the sky. Athletes later marched into the stadium by order of sports competed at the games.

They were then followed by Vietnamese music played by the Vietnamese Symphonic Orchestra and performance by local dancers and singers. Nguyen Danh Thai, Minister-Chairman of the State Committee for Physical Training and Sports, President of the 22nd SEA Games Council and Head of the 22nd SEA Games Organising Committee gave his speech, affirmed that the Games have successfully concluded after boisterous competition days. Deputy Prime Minister Pham Gia Khiem, Chairman of the 22nd SEA Games national steering board, on behalf of the host country, declared the regional sporting event closed.

Then the blue SEA Games flag was taken down and brought to the Vietnamese representatives by the Vietnamese Army soldiers dressed in white uniform with Vietnamese singer My Linh and a Philippine singer sang the song “For the World of Tomorrow”. At the same time, the flame of the cauldron was extinguished. Prime Minister Nguyen Danh Thai and Chairman of the Hanoi People's Committee Hoang Van Nghien handed over the SEA Games Flag to the Chairman of the Games Organising Committee Roberto Pagdanganan and the Mayor of Manila, Lito Atienza, symbolises the Southeast Asian Games responsibilities being handed over to Philippines, host of the 2005 Southeast Asian Games. The national anthem of the Philippines was played as the National Flag of the Philippines was raised. After that, the Filipino performance troop presented a special folk art performance, representing the host country. The ceremony concluded with a Vietnam farewell segment performance by Vietnamese dancers, showing the culture of Vietnam.

Participating nations

 
 
 
 
 
 
 
 
 
 
  (Host)

Sports

 
 
³
 
 
 
 
 
 
 ¹
 ¹
 
 
 ¹
 
 
 
 
 
 
 
 ²
 ²
 
 ¹
 
 ³
 
 
 
 ¹
 
 
 
 ¹

¹ - not an official Olympic Sport
² - sport played only in the SEA Games
³ - not a traditional Olympic nor SEA Games Sport and introduced only by the host country.

Calendar

Medal table
A total of 1440 medals, comprising 444 gold medals, 441 silver medals and 555 bronze medals were awarded to athletes. The host Vietnam performance was its best ever yet in Southeast Asian Games history, emerged as overall champion of the games.

See also
 2003 ASEAN Para Games

References

External links
 

 
Southeast Asian Games
Multi-sport events in Vietnam
S
S
Southeast Asian Games, 2003
2003 in Asian sport
Sport in Hanoi
21st century in Hanoi